Understanding is a compilation album by female R&B act Xscape, released on December 22, 2002.

Track listing 
Let Me Know – 3:41
Love on My Mind – 3:51
Understanding – 5:42
What Can I Do – 3:06
Do Like Lovers Do – 4:36
Work Me Slow – 4:13
Do You Want To – 5:43
I Will – 4:11
My Little Secret – 4:29
One of Those Love Songs – 4:15

Albums produced by Jermaine Dupri
Xscape (group) compilations albums
2002 compilation albums